

395001–395100 

|-bgcolor=#f2f2f2
| colspan=4 align=center | 
|}

395101–395200 

|-id=141
| 395141 Césarmanrique || 2010 CC || César Manrique (1919–1992) was a Canarian painter, sculptor and artist. He combined his work with his support for the environmental of the Canary Islands. He sought harmony between art and nature as a creative space. He won the World Prize for Ecology and Tourism and the Europe Prize. || 
|-id=148
| 395148 Kurnin ||  || Georgy I. Kurnin (1915–1988), a science-fiction artist, art historian and amateur astronomer. || 
|}

395201–395300 

|-bgcolor=#f2f2f2
| colspan=4 align=center | 
|}

395301–395400 

|-bgcolor=#f2f2f2
| colspan=4 align=center | 
|}

395401–395500 

|-bgcolor=#f2f2f2
| colspan=4 align=center | 
|}

395501–395600 

|-bgcolor=#f2f2f2
| colspan=4 align=center | 
|}

395601–395700 

|-bgcolor=#f2f2f2
| colspan=4 align=center | 
|}

395701–395800 

|-bgcolor=#f2f2f2
| colspan=4 align=center | 
|}

395801–395900 

|-bgcolor=#f2f2f2
| colspan=4 align=center | 
|}

395901–396000 

|-bgcolor=#f2f2f2
| colspan=4 align=center | 
|}

References 

395001-396000